was a Japanese four-panel manga series written and illustrated by Emily. It had been serialized in Media Factory's Comic Cune magazine since August 2014 and the chapters have collected into five tankōbon volumes. An anime television series adaptation by Asahi Production aired in Japan from April to June 2016.

Characters

 The main protagonist of the story. She is outgoing, happy, and is extremely fond of egg sandwiches.

 A fellow student and friend of Minami. She is shy and likes to draw (but is very insecure about showing off her work). The first friend Minami made at school after admiring Yū's bread keychains on her bag. She likes curry bread.

 A fellow student and friend of Minami. Her family owns a bakery called "Fuwa Fuyu" (Fluffy Winter).

 A fellow student and friend of Minami. Her favorite kind of bread are baguettes, which she occasionally uses as weapon to defend herself from physical contact. She is often mistaken to be a grade schooler, due to her petite body and young looks, despite being the same age as her friends.

Noa's little sister.

A girl who works at the Guillame French Bakery and befriends Noa.

Mai's older sister.

Media

Manga
Pan de Peace! was a four-panel manga series by Emily (styled as "emily"), a Japanese manga artist who mainly draws adult comics. It began serialization in Comic Cune'''s October 2014 issue released on August 27, 2014; At first, Comic Cune was a "magazine in magazine" placed in Monthly Comic Alive, later it became independent of Comic Alive and changed to a formal magazine on August 27, 2015. Pan de Peace! is also available on Kadokawa Corporation's ComicWalker website. It ended on November 27, 2017 in the January issue. Five tankōbon volumes of the manga were released as of December 2017 in Japan.

Anime 
An anime television series produced by Asahi Production aired in Japan between April 4, 2016 and June 27, 2016. Hatsuki Tsuji directed the series at Asahi Production. Momoko Murakami is in charge of series composition, and Shizue Kaneko designed the characters. It was simulcast by Crunchyroll.

Episode list

References

 External links 
  
 Pan de Peace! at ComicWalker'' 
 Official Anime Website
 

Anime series based on manga
Asahi Production
Comedy anime and manga
Media Factory manga
Kadokawa Dwango franchises
School life in anime and manga
Yonkoma
Seinen manga